Catarman Cathedral, also known as the Our Lady of the Annunciation Cathedral Parish, is a Roman Catholic cathedral in the Philippine municipality of Catarman, Northern Samar, in the country's Eastern Visayas region. It is dedicated to the Virgin Mary under the title Our Lady of the Annunciation, and has been the cathedral of the Diocese of Catarman since the diocese's establishment in 1974.

History
 The Jesuits ordered the construction of the first church made out of wood and nipa as a visita of the parish of Palapag, under the patronage of the Nuestra Senora de la Anunciacion in 1596. The said church was subsequently reconstructed after it was burned in an uprising headed by Agustin Sumuroy in 1649. The Franciscans took over the administration of Catarman in 1768. Fray Vicente Lopez, OFM ordered the construction of the fort as a defense against the frequent raids of Moro pirates. On December 8, 1854, the church was again reconstructed after suffering heavy damage during a typhoon. The parish church of Catarman became the island's newest cathedral when it was canonically dedicated as the seat of the Diocese of Catarman on March 11, 1975.

References

External links
 Facebook page 

Roman Catholic churches in Northern Samar
Marked Historical Structures of the Philippines
Roman Catholic cathedrals in the Philippines
18th-century Roman Catholic church buildings in the Philippines
19th-century Roman Catholic church buildings in the Philippines
20th-century Roman Catholic church buildings in the Philippines
Catarman, Northern Samar